This is a list of the extreme points of Catalonia, the points that are farther north, south, east or west than any other location, as well as the highest point in the autonomous community.

Catalonia (points)
 Northernmost Point — Tuc de Sacauba, Val d'Aran  at 
 Southernmost Point — Alcanar, Montsià at 
 Westernmost Point — Tossal del Rei, Montsià at 
 Easternmost Point — Cap de Creus, Alt Empordà at

Catalonia (settlements)
 Northernmost Settlement — Canejan, Val d'Aran  at 
 Southernmost Settlement — Alcanar, Montsià at 
 Westernmost Settlement — Caseres, Terra Alta at 
 Easternmost Settlement — Cadaqués, Alt Empordà at

Elevation
 Highest Point — Pica d'Estats, Pallars Sobirà at 

Geography of Catalonia
Landforms of Catalonia
Catalonia